Erwin Frederick Graf Jr. (July 28, 1917 – October 12, 2005) was an American basketball player who played two seasons in the National Basketball League (NBL) of the United States.  Graf, from Elgin, Illinois, played college basketball at Marquette University and for the Sheboygan Red Skins of the NBL.  In two seasons with the Red Skins, Graf averaged 2.2 points over 6 NBL games.  He was also known by the nicknames "Moose" and "Ike."

References

1917 births
2005 deaths
All-American college men's basketball players
American men's basketball players
Basketball players from Illinois
Centers (basketball)
Marquette Golden Eagles men's basketball coaches
Marquette Golden Eagles men's basketball players
Power forwards (basketball)
Sheboygan Red Skins players
Sportspeople from Elgin, Illinois